Conor Maloney (born 8 February 1974) is an Irish sprint canoer who has competed in the mid-1990s. At the 1996 Summer Olympics in Atlanta, he was eliminated in the repechages of both the K-2 500 m and the K-2 1000 m event.

References
Sports-Reference.com profile

1974 births
Canoeists at the 1996 Summer Olympics
Irish male canoeists
Living people
Olympic canoeists of Ireland